Eric Eastwood (24 March 1916 – October 1991) was an English footballer who played for Manchester City and Port Vale in the Football League in the period following World War II.

Career
Eastwood played for local non-league teams Chorley Road Congregationals, Little Lever, Westhoughton and Heywood St. James's, before joining Manchester City. After spells guesting for Bolton Wanderers and Manchester United during the war he signed to Port Vale from Manchester City for a four-figure fee in March 1947. He scored his first goal in the Football League on 26 April, in a 2–1 win over Bristol Rovers at The Old Recreation Ground, and went on to play six Third Division South games in the 1946–47 season. He featured in 19 league and FA Cup games in the 1947–48 season, but was transfer listed by manager Gordon Hodgson as he appeared just four times in the 1948–49 campaign. He suffered with groin muscle problems and left on a free transfer in April 1950 after failing to make it onto the pitch in the 1949–50 season.

Career statistics
Source:

References

1916 births
1991 deaths
People from Heywood, Greater Manchester
English footballers
Association football midfielders
Manchester City F.C. players
Bolton Wanderers F.C. wartime guest players
Manchester United F.C. wartime guest players
Port Vale F.C. players
English Football League players